The Ticket is a 2016 American drama film directed by Ido Fluk and written by Ido Fluk and Sharon Mashihi. The film stars Malin Åkerman, Dan Stevens, Kerry Bishé, Oliver Platt, Liza J. Bennett, and Skylar Gaertner.

The film had its world premiere at the Tribeca Film Festival on April 16, 2016, and was released on April 7, 2017, by Shout! Factory.

Plot
James, who has been blind from youth, lives a contented life with his wife Sam and son Jonah. One day he regains his vision and discovers that an inoperable pituitary tumor that had been pressing on his optic nerves since he was a teenager has miraculously shrunk. Giddy with happiness, James and Sam make plans for their future. However, James finds himself becoming metaphorically blinded by his obsession for the superficial in his pursuit of success.

Cast
Malin Åkerman as Sam
Dan Stevens as James
Kerry Bishé as Jessica
Oliver Platt as Bob
Liza J. Bennett as Grace
Skylar Gaertner as Jonah
Peter Mark Kendall as Arnold Dixon
Ekaterina Samsonov as Carla

Production
In August 2014, Malin Åkerman and Dan Stevens joined the cast of the film, with Ido Fluk directing the film from a screenplay by him and Sharon Mashihi, Oren Moverman and Lawrence Inglee serving as producers, while Dale Brown, Nick Byasse, and Katie Heidy will serve as executive producers under their Cave Films, Initiate, and Liberty Liquid Films banners, respectively. That same month, Oliver Platt and Kerry Bishé joined the cast of the film.

Release
The film premiered at the Tribeca Film Festival on April 16, 2016. Shortly after, Shout! Factory acquired U.S distribution rights to the film. The film was released in a limited release and through video on demand on April 7, 2017.

Reception
The film received a mixed reception, with critics praising the acting and certain cinematic elements but lamenting the slow pace and predictability of the plot. Jon Frosch of The Hollywood Reporter noted that "Fluk's compositions are at once chilly and sensual, with a European art cinema buff's attention to bodies, and there are lovely moments throughout" and praised Stevens' portrayal of the lead character but commented that "once you see where the movie's going it's a bit of a slog". Nigel M. Smith of The Guardian gave the film three stars out of five: "Admirably cynical until it loses its way in the final stretch, The Ticket nevertheless maintains a provocative allure, bolstered by a fiercely committed performance from Dan Stevens."

References

External links
 
 

2016 films
2016 drama films
American drama films
American independent films
2016 independent films
2010s English-language films
2010s American films